Nightfall is a Greek extreme metal band from Athens. Formed by vocalist/bassist Efthimis Karadimas in 1991, the group is currently signed to Season of Mist. They are widely considered the forerunners to a "mediterranean way to black metal" together with Inchiuvatu and Moonspell.

History
Nightfall was formed in 1991 by frontman and bassist Efthimis Karadimas. Within a few months of existence, Karadimas had produced Nightfall's one-and-only demo tape, Vanity. The 4 track demo was noticed by Holy Records, a new French record label that was looking for an act to use to help introduce itself to the music business worldwide. A deal followed and gave birth to the debut release of Nightfall and Holy Records, Parade into Centuries, in 1992. The release proved a successful pioneering step as time went on for both Nightfall and Holy Records. This paradigm was followed by many in both countries, establishing a tradition for French labels to release Greek metal albums.

Nightfall stayed with Holy Records throughout the decade, resulting in 1994's Macabre Sunsets, 1995's Athenian Echoes, 1997's Lesbian Show, and 1999's Diva Futura, backed by European tours. Line-up changes were effected in almost every release, with Karadimas remaining the only constant. The early days saw Chris Adamou on rhythm guitars and Costas Savvidis on drums, while later Jim Agelopoulos and Phil Anton would take the guitar spot; Bob Katsionis would join on keys for their summer of 2001 Wacken appearance, with Mark Cross on drums, and Mike Galiatsos coming in on lead guitars. Katsionis would later handle guitar duties as well, and both himself and Cross would later go on to perform with Greek power metal outfit Firewind (the main band of guitarist Gus G).

The next few years saw the band changing direction and a new record deal was signed with Greek label Black Lotus Records with whom Nightfall released two albums: 2003's I Am Jesus and 2005's Lyssa: Rural Gods and Astonishing Punishments. George Bokos appeared as a guitarist on Lyssa. In 2005 the band ceased its live performances for good and George Bokos joined fellow Greeks Rotting Christ. The same year drummer George Kollias, who had replaced Cross some years prior and appeared on both albums, ended up in the American death metal band Nile.

The band had apparently split up (although no official announcement was ever made about it), yet in early 2009  Stathis Kassios (known to Efthimis Karadimas from his on stage keyboard services in the previous years) introduced American guitarist Evan Hensley to Karadimas in an effort to convince him to record some new compositions together. German drummer and producer Jörg Uken was already in touch with Efthimis Karadimas, and words became actions in early 2010 when this new line-up was announced. This new line-up and the new sound it delivered attracted American label Metal Blade Records, who offered a record deal.

Their 2010 release, Astron Black and the Thirty Tyrants, was released on Metal Blade Records in August, 2010. The album was well-received, garnering high praise from numerous international critics, and included artwork by noted American cover artist Travis Smith.

In 2011, the band added two new members to further round out their line-up: guitarist Constantine and bassist Stathis Ridis.

After the release of their 2013 album, Cassiopeia, Nightfall went on hiatus.  In June 2020, the band announced their return to live performances through their official Facebook page. The band's current line up, apart from Efthimis Karadimas on vocals and bass, includes returning members Mike Galiatsos  and Kostas Kyriakopoulos on guitars, as well as Fotis Bernardo of Septicflesh fame on drums.

In July 2020, Nightfall announced a record deal with French label Season of Mist, as well as that they are working on a new album that will be released in early 2021.  In addition, Season of Mist has announced that it has acquired distribution rights for the band's entire Holy Records release catalog.

Eight years after their previous album, Nightfall released "At Night We Prey" on March 5, 2021.

Members

Current members
 Efthimis Karadimas - vocals (1991–present), bass (1991-1999, 2002–2005, 2005–2010, 2020–2021), Keyboards (1991-1992, 1999–2005, 2020-present)
 Mike Galiatsos - guitars (1991–1999, 2020–present)
 Kostas Kyriakopoulos - bass (2004–2005), guitars (2020–present)
 Fotis Benardo - drums (2020–present)
 Vassiliki Biza - bass (2021–present)

Former members
 Chris Adamou - guitars (1991–1995)
 Costas Savidis - drums (1991–1995)
 George Aspiotis - keyboards, piano, effects (1992–1999)
 Jim Agelopoulos - guitars (1996-1997)
 Phil Anton - guitars (1998–2000)
 Bob Katsionis - guitar, keyboards (1999–2005)
 Marc McKnight - bass (1999–2002)
 Mark Cross - drums (1999-2000)
 George Kollias - drums (2000–2005)
 George Bokos - guitar (2002–2005)
 Fotis Anagnostou - bass (1999, died in 2021)
 Nikos Papadopoulos - bass (2010-2011)
 Evan Hensley - guitars (2009–2020)
 Constantine - guitars (2011–2020)
 Stathis Ridis - bass (2011–2020)
 Stathis Kassios - keyboards (2004–2020)
 Jörg Uken - drums (2009–2020)

Timeline

Discography
 Parade into Centuries (1992)
 Macabre Sunsets (1994)
 Eons Aura EP (1995)
 Athenian Echoes (1995)
 Lesbian Show (1997)
 Electronegative (1999)
 Diva Futura (1999)
 I Am Jesus (2003)
 Lyssa: Rural Gods and Astonishing Punishments (2004)
 Astron Black and the Thirty Tyrants (2010)
 Cassiopeia (2013)
 At Night We Prey (2021)

References

Greek melodic death metal musical groups
Greek gothic metal musical groups
Greek black metal musical groups
Symphonic black metal musical groups
Greek heavy metal musical groups
Musical groups established in 1991
Musical groups disestablished in 2006
Musical groups reestablished in 2010
Musical groups from Athens
1991 establishments in Greece